Goumogo is a town in the Thyou Department of Boulkiemdé Province in central western Burkina Faso. It has a population of 1,744.

References

Populated places in Boulkiemdé Province